Andre Agassi won the inaugural singles tennis title at the 2002 Madrid Open after Jiří Novák withdrew from the final.

Seeds
A champion seed is indicated in bold text while text in italics indicates the round in which that seed was eliminated. All sixteen seeds received a bye into the second round.

  Tommy Haas (second round, retired due to a blister on his right hand)
  Andre Agassi (champion)
  Marat Safin (second round)
  Tim Henman (second round)
  Juan Carlos Ferrero (quarterfinals)
  Albert Costa (withdrew)
  Sébastien Grosjean (semifinals)
  Carlos Moyá (third round)
  Yevgeny Kafelnikov (second round)
  Andy Roddick (second round)
  Jiří Novák (final, withdrew due to a right hamstring injury)
  Roger Federer (quarterfinals)
  Guillermo Cañas (second round)
  Sjeng Schalken (second round)
  Thomas Johansson (third round)
  Younes El Aynaoui (second round)

Draw

Finals

Top half

Section 1

Section 2

Bottom half

Section 3

Section 4

Qualifying

Qualifying seeds

Qualifiers

Lucky loser
  José Acasuso

Qualifying draw

First qualifier

Second qualifier

Third qualifier

Fourth qualifier

Fifth qualifier

Sixth qualifier

References

External links
 2002 Mutua Madrileña Masters Madrid Draw
 ITF tournament profile
 Main draw (ATP)
 Qualifying draw (ATP)

Men's Singles
Mutua Madrid